A by-election was held for the Australian House of Representatives seat of Riverina on 18 May 1904. This was triggered after the result at the 1903 election, which had seen Free Trade candidate Robert Blackwood narrowly defeat Protectionist MP John Chanter, was declared void due to allegations of electoral irregularities.

At the by-election Chanter defeated Blackwood.

Results

References

1904 elections in Australia
New South Wales federal by-elections
1900s in New South Wales